is a horizontally scrolling shoot 'em up arcade game released by Atlus in 1992 and was ported to the Super Nintendo Entertainment System in the same year. The game's most distinguishable feature is that players come equipped with a device that allows them to freeze and control certain robots.

Gameplay
The player is set in control of The Garland TFF-01, a sub-standard space fighter ship that is only armed with a semi-auto or rapid fire laser gun known as the Beam Vulcan and the Tranquilander. Some enemy units can be captured and used in play; certain enemy robots, when shot by the player's Tranquilander, will morph into an outline of themselves. The player can then fly into the outline, and take on the form of the enemy robot, taking control of its weapons, abilities and special attacks.

There is also an addition to the boss battle scoring: similar to some shooters, players have the opportunity to increase their scores by beating the end level bosses within a certain time limit. Every time a boss battle is initiated, a timer will count down and once the boss is destroyed/killed before the timer reaches zero, then the time left will add to the player's end-level score; if the timer runs out, then the score at the end of the level will remain unaffected. Extends/1 Ups were awarded every 300,000 points.

The Bio-Cyborgs
Mars: A Bio-Cyborg armed with the three-way firing Mega Cannon and comes equipped with three Atomic Shields which are two-second long explosive rings that protect the cyborg from harm.

Grain Beat/Odyssey: A Bio-Cyborg armed only with the Funnel guns which can be arranged to fire in three different forward-firing positions.

Shadow Blade: The fastest of the Bio-Cyborgs which comes equipped with the Twin Cannon and the Dimension Field which makes the ship invincible for ten seconds.

Titan: A muscular Bio-Cyborg armed with the Slice Laser and comes equipped with unlimited homing missiles.

Neptune: A horned Bio-Cyborg armed with the Wide Lazer and is equipped with two Hyper-Bombs, a powerful blast that fires forward.

Baron: A winged Bio-Cyborg armed with the Sonic Gun and is equipped with unlimited Diffusing Bombs, a bomb that fires onto ground forces.

Hyper D: The slowest of the Bio-Cyborgs which comes equipped with the twin, diagonal firing Beam Gun and is equipped with unlimited Vertical Shields’, a flare weapon that not only hurts enemies but also destroys most enemy shots.

Story
A united space force known as the Imperial Earth Army was launched past the Solar System. When the Imperial Earth Army returned, it came armed with large, living robots known as Bio-Cyborgs that it used to dominate and oppress the societies of Earth. Players assume the role of a rebel forces pilot who has launched a surprise attack against the oppressive Imperial Earth Army, armed with a recently developed weapon capable of controlling the Bio-Cyborgs.

Super NES version
BlaZeon was ported from the arcades to the Super NES. However, there were some significant differences between the two:

The animated opening from the original was completely removed from the console version.
2 Player co-op was removed from the home console port, although an option to change the game's difficulty and ship color was included.
Many enemies were cut from the home console version: in stage 3, the walker enemies were removed and placed only once in the final stage while some of the organic enemies in stage 4 were either removed or their AI was changed.
Many parts of the battleship Guanols were cut in the SNES port including a transport carrying parts of the level boss.
The design of the underground stage, Shurice, was redesigned in backgrounds, foregrounds and mini-bosses in the console port. The level was also originally the third level in the Arcade version, but switched to Stage 4 in the console port.
The ending (which only showed the game's Credits) was removed entirely from the home console version; instead, players restart the game with the same score and lives they beat the game with on a higher difficulty.

Reception 

BlaZeon garnered mixed reception from critics, some of which reviewed it as an import title. The Super Nintendo Entertainment System version holds a 42.25% rating at the review aggregator site GameRankings. In Japan, Game Machine listed the original arcade release on their June 1, 1992 issue as being the tenth most-popular arcade game for the previous two weeks. When reviewing the Super NES adaptation, Joypads Olivier Prézeau reviewed the Super NES criticized the graphical presentation for its small sprites and jerky animations, but was fond of the ability to capture and use the enemies. in contrast, Consoles + François Hermellin also reviewed the Super Nintendo conversion and labelled the graphics as "splendid and colorful". Hermellin commended the conversion further for the lack of slowdown, soundtrack, and playability, but felt that the game lacked ambition and lambasted its overall presentation. Video Games Jan Barysch disagreed with Hermellin, writing that the SNES port was "jerky, heavy as hell, and poorly thought out." Electronic Gaming Monthlys four reviewers found the SNES version to be "a better than average shooter", noting its capture power-up mechanic.

Nintendo Powers three reviewers liked the ability to assume control of each Bio-Cyborgs, they ultimately regarded the Super NES version to be an average scrolling shooter. Play Times Robert Reichsmann commended the graphics and music of the Super Nintendo port, but felt mixed about its gameplay. British publication Super Gamer gave the SNES conversion an unfavorable review, stating: "Terrible scrolling backgrounds and poor gameplay ensure unhappiness." Reviewing the original arcade release, AllGames Brett Alan Weiss noted the ability to control captured enemies as an original element. Nevertheless, Weiss regarded BlaZeon to be an unremarkable and mediocre shooter, citing its slow action, and generic audiovisual presentation. Roger Post of SHMUPS! (a classic network of GameSpy) reviewed the SNES adaptation, finding its gameplay slow and the soundtrack repetitive. Hardcore Gaming 101s Brett Pritchard disagreed with Weiss and Post, giving both the arcade and SNES versions positive retrospective outlooks.

Notes

References

External links
BlaZeon credits
Soundtrack information at SNESmusic.org

1992 video games
A.I Company games
Arcade video games
Atlus games
Horizontally scrolling shooters
Super Nintendo Entertainment System games
Video games developed in Japan
Video games scored by Tsukasa Masuko
Multiplayer and single-player video games